Velódromo de Anoeta (formally and in Basque language Anoetako Belodromoa) is an indoor arena located at the Anoeta Sports Complex in San Sebastián, Spain. The arena holds a capacity for 5,500 spectators.

It is primarily used for indoor athletics, motocross events, and concerts.

References

Velodromes in Spain
Indoor arenas in Spain
Indoor track and field venues
Sports venues in the Basque Country (autonomous community)